Robert Livermore (October 16, 1909 – February 12, 1991) was an American alpine skier. He competed in the men's combined event at the 1936 Winter Olympics. He graduated from Harvard University.

References

External links
 

1909 births
1991 deaths
American male alpine skiers
Olympic alpine skiers of the United States
Alpine skiers at the 1936 Winter Olympics
Sportspeople from Boston
Harvard College alumni
20th-century American people